Tucson Raiders is a 1944 American Western film directed by Spencer Gordon Bennet and starring Wild Bill Elliott in the role of Red Ryder. It was the first of twenty-three Red Ryder feature films that would be produced by Republic Pictures. The picture was shot on the studio’s back lot along with outdoor locations at Iverson Ranch, 1 Iverson Lane, Chatsworth, Los Angeles.

Plot
Tucson Raiders is set in 1895’s Painted Valley, Colorado. Wild Bill Elliott, makes his first appearance as Red Ryder and Robert Blake’s first as Little Beaver, Red discovers that he has been framed for murder. His little Indian pal, Little Beaver, manages to foil the corrupt Sheriff Kirk’s (Ed Cassidy) plan to kill Red as he escapes from jail. Hannah Rogers (Ruth Lee) in the pay of Governor York (Stanley Andrews), a dishonest politician, tries to trick Red in escaping jail. However, her scheme fails and Red Ryder shoots his way out. He manages to intercept a payroll robbery but finds that Little Beaver has been captured by the outlaws. The "red headed" cowboy exposes Hannah’s plot, saves Little Beaver and brings an end to Governor York’s gang.

Cast
Wild Bill Elliott as Red Ryder
Robert Blake as Little Beaver
Alice Fleming as The Duchess (Red's Aunt)
George "Gabby" Hayes as Gabby Hopkins
Ruth Lee as Hannah Rogers
Peggy Stewart as Beth Rogers
LeRoy Mason as Jeff Stark
Stanley Andrews as Governor York
John Whitney as Tom Hamilton
Bud Geary as Deputy One Eye
Karl Hackett as Reverend George Allen
Tom Steele as Deputy Logan
Marshall Reed as Deputy
Tom Chatterton as Judge James Wayne
Ed Cassidy as Sheriff Kirk (as Edward Cassidy)
Foxy Callahan as Stagecoach Guard (uncredited)
Tommy Coats as Saloon Henchman (uncredited)
Kenne Duncan as Henchman (voice) (uncredited)
Fred Graham as Henchman (uncredited)
Neal Hart as Barfly (uncredited)
Edward Howard as Deputy Logan (uncredited)
Jack Kirk as Brawler (voice) (uncredited)
Bert LeBaron as Rancher (uncredited)
Tom London as Matthews (voice) (uncredited)
Frank McCarroll as Henchman (uncredited)
Post Park as Sam - 1st Stagecoach driver (uncredited)
Frank Pershing as Townsman (uncredited)
Charles Sullivan as Bartender (uncredited)
Ken Terrell as Saloon Henchman (uncredited)
Ted Wells as Barfly (uncredited)
Bud Wolfe as Henchman (uncredited)

Production
Tucson Raiders was based on Fred Harman’s comic strip, Red Ryder. It was the first of Republic's Red Ryder feature series and the first to star Wild Bill Elliott as Red Ryder and Robert Blake as Little Beaver. When Eliott was promoted up to the more adult features and replaced by Alan Lane, Blake continued on in the role for the remaining 22 films.

Stunts
Yakima Canutt
Tom Steele
Bud Geary
Fred Graham
Foxy Callahan
Tommy Coats
Bert LeBaron
Carey Loftin
Frank McCarrol
Ken Terrel
Ted Wells
Joe Yrigoyen

References

External links
Tucson Raiders, IMDb
Tucson Raiders, Turner Classic Movies

1944 films
1944 Western (genre) films
Films set in 1895
Films set in Colorado
American black-and-white films
Republic Pictures films
American Western (genre) films
Films based on comic strips
Films based on American comics
Films directed by Spencer Gordon Bennet
1940s English-language films
1940s American films
Red Ryder films